Slansky or Slánský is a surname. Notable people with the surname include:

Richard Slansky (1940–1998), American theoretical physicist
Rudolf Slánský (1901–1952), Czech Communist politician
Rudolf Slánský Jr., Czech ambassador to Russia (1993–1996)

See also
Slánský trial, 1952 show trial in Czechoslovakia

Czech-language surnames